Logan may refer to:

Places
 Mount Logan (disambiguation)

Australia
 Logan (Queensland electoral district), an electoral district in the Queensland Legislative Assembly
 Logan, Victoria, small locality near St. Arnaud
 Logan City, local government area in Queensland
 Shire of Logan, predecessor to Logan City
 Logan Lagoon, Flinders Island, Tasmania
 Logan River, river flowing into Moreton Bay, Queensland
 Logan Village, Queensland, a town and locality within Logan City, Queensland

Canada
 Mount Logan, Canada's highest mountain
 Logan (Manitoba electoral district), former electoral district in the Canadian province of Manitoba
 Logan Lake, a district municipality in the Southern Interior of British Columbia

United Kingdom
 Logan Botanic Garden, Wigtownshire, Scotland
 Logan, East Ayrshire, Scotland

United States
 Logan, Alabama
 Logan, Arkansas
 Logan, Edgar County, Illinois
 Logan Square, Chicago, Illinois
 Logan, Dearborn County, Indiana
 Logan, Lawrence County, Indiana
 Logan, Iowa
 Logan, Kansas
 Logan International Airport, Boston, Massachusetts
 Logan, Greene County, Missouri
 Logan, Lawrence County, Missouri
 Logan, Montana
 Logan Pass, pass in Glacier National Park, Montana
 Billings Logan International Airport, Billings, Montana
 Logan, Michigan, the original name of Adrian, Michigan
 Logan, Nebraska
 Logan, New Mexico
 Logan, North Dakota
 Logan, Ohio
 Logan, Oklahoma
 Logan, Oregon
 Logan, Philadelphia, Pennsylvania, a neighborhood
 Logan Run, a tributary of the Susquehanna River in Northumberland County, Pennsylvania
 Logan, Utah
 Logan Peak, mountain near Cache Valley, Utah
 Logan Canyon, mountain canyon in northern Utah
 Logan, West Virginia
 Logan, Wisconsin
 Logan County (disambiguation)
 Logan Township (disambiguation)

People

 Logan (given name), including a list of people and fictional characters
 Logan (surname)
 General Logan (disambiguation)
 Senator Logan (disambiguation)
 Clan Logan, a Scottish clan
 Logan (Iroquois leader) (c. 1723?–1780), Native American orator and war leader
 Captain Logan (c. 1776 – 1812), Shawnee warrior also known as Logan or Spemica Lawba

Fictional characters
 Logan (X-Men film series character)

Entertainment
 Logan (novel), an 1822 novel by American writer John Neal
 Logan (band), a rock band from Glasgow, Scotland
 Logan (film), a 2017 American film featuring the Marvel Comics character Wolverine
Logan (album), a 2021 Album by South African Rapper Emtee

Geology
 Logan Medal, an award given to Canadian geologists for outstanding contribution to the field
 Logan Rock, a rocking stone found in Cornwall, United Kingdom
 Rocking stones, also known as logan stones, large stones that are carefully balanced so as to move with the slightest touch
 Logan or pokelogan,  a shallow, swampy lake or pond

Vehicles
 Logan (automobile), an American car produced in Ohio 1903–1908
 Logan (cyclecar), an American car produced in Chicago 1914
 Dacia Logan, a low cost automobile produced by Renault and Dacia

Other uses
 Logan (magazine), an American bimonthly for young people with disabilities
 Logan, a 2-row barley variety

See also

 
 Logan Act, a United States law forbidding private citizens from negotiating with foreign governments
 Logan v. Zimmerman Brush Co., a U.S. Supreme Court decision on the right to due process of law
 Logan's Roadhouse, an American restaurant chain 
 Longan, a southeast Asian fruit sometimes misspelled “Logan”
 Loganville (disambiguation)
 Logansport (disambiguation)